Taste in Translation is an American Cooking show series produced by Leopard Films that currently airs on the Cooking Channel. The series is hosted by Aarti Sequeira, an Indian cook and television personality, who is best known as the winner of the sixth season of Food Network's reality television show, The Next Food Network Star. In the series, Aarti searches for the most popular dishes from around the world and takes an in depth look at the history and cultural significance in the dishes she tastes. Each episode has a different dish theme, such as a barbecue or a birthday theme for an episode. The series premiered on January 4, 2013.

References

External links
 
 

2010s American cooking television series
English-language television shows
2013 American television series debuts